Stoner Creek is a stream in Bourbon and Clark counties, Kentucky, in the United States.

It was named for Michael Stoner, who settled near the creek in the 18th century. Stoner Creek is said to be where bourbon whiskey was first imparted with its distinctive color.

Stoner Creek runs through Kentucky horse country.

See also
Stoner Creek Stud
List of rivers of Kentucky

References

Rivers of Bourbon County, Kentucky
Rivers of Clark County, Kentucky
Rivers of Kentucky